Akine is a village in Anamur district of Mersin Province, Turkey. It is situated in the Taurus Mountains along Dragon Creek. The population of Akine is 428  as of 2011. It is planned that a part of the village (along with Çaltıbükü, Ormancık and Sarıağaç) will be submerged in Alaköprü Dam reservoir.

References

Villages in Anamur District